Nichollsia may refer to the following genera of animals:

Nichollsia, a genus of crustacean
Nichollssaura, formerly Nichollsia, an extinct genus of plesiosaur